HMS Narwhal was a  which served with the Royal Navy during the First World War. The M class were an improvement on the preceding , capable of higher speed. Launched on 30 December 1915, the vessel fought in the Battle of Jutland between 31 May and 1 June 1916 and subsequently served in anti-submarine and escort duties based at Cobh in Ireland.

Design and development
Narwhal was one of sixteen s ordered by the British Admiralty in February 1915 as part of the Fourth War Construction Programme. The M-class was an improved version of the earlier  destroyers, required to reach a higher speed in order to counter rumoured German fast destroyers. It transpired that the German ships did not exist.

Displacement was  normal and  full load. The ship achieved  during trials. Three funnels were fitted.

Armament consisted of three single QF  Mk IV guns on the ship's centreline, with one on the forecastle, one aft on a raised platform and one between the middle and aft funnels. Two single QF 2-pounder  "pom-pom" anti-aircraft guns were carried, while torpedo armament consisted of two twin rotating mounts for  torpedoes. The ship had a complement of 76 officers and ratings.

Construction and career
Narwhal was laid down by William Denny and Brothers of Dumbarton on 21 April 1915 with the yard number 1046, launched on 30 December and completed on 3 March the following year. The ship was named after the toothed whale. The vessel was deployed as part of the Grand Fleet, joining the Twelfth Destroyer Flotilla.

Between 31 May and 1 June 1916, Narwhal sailed as part of the Flotilla, led by the flotilla leader  to confront the German High Seas Fleet in the Battle of Jutland. The ship managed to launch two torpedoes from her port side against the German Fleet, but both missed.

In February 1917, the destroyer was transferred to Cobh, Ireland, to counter increasing activity by German submarines in the Southwest Approaches. The submarines had been very active and the Royal Navy had resorted to introducing Q-ships to try and ambush them. On 17 February, Narwhal was called upon to rescue the crew of one of these ships, which was sunk by and sank . Nine days later, the ship chased away  from attacking the armed merchantman . Escort duties continued, including accompanying convoys to Liverpool from 27 March.

During 1918, Narwhal was transferred to Devonport as part of the Fourth Destroyer Flotilla. After the Armistice of 11 November 1918 that ended the war, the destroyer remained in Devonport and, shortly afterwards, joined the local defence flotilla at the base. Narwhal was damaged in a collision in 1919 and returned to Devonport to be broken up the following year. The vessel's name was subsequently used by two submarines that served with the Royal Navy.

Pennant numbers

References

Citations

Bibliography

 
 
 
 
 
 
 
 
 
 
 

1915 ships
Admiralty M-class destroyers
Ships built on the River Clyde
World War I destroyers of the United Kingdom